Methanoperedens nitroreducens (from Latin: methano, meaning "methane", peredens, meaning "consuming", nitro, meaning "nitrate", and reducens, meaning "leading back") is a candidate species of methanotrophic archaea that oxidizes methane by coupling to nitrate reduction.

Morphology 
Methanoperedens nitroreducens is an archaea that grows as an irregular cocci with a diameter of 1-3 µm. Ideal conditions for M. nitroreducens growth consist of temperatures around 72-95°F and a neutral to slightly basic pH of 7-8. M. nitroreducens has been cultured in a bioreactor, but a pure culture has not been cultivated.

Metabolism 
Only two known organisms are currently known to be able to couple methane oxidation with nitrate or nitrite reduction (Methanoperedens nitroreducens and Methylomirabilis oxyfera). Methanoperedens nitroreducens utilizes the process of anaerobic oxidation of methane (AOM). AOM is an important environmental process that functions as a sink of methane, lowering the gas' overall impact on climate change. This process was originally discovered to be paired with sulfate reduction but now also known to be paired with nitrate and metal ion (Mn4+ or Fe3+) reduction. M. nitroreducens uses reverse methanogenesis with nitrate as the terminal electron acceptor.  This is the first anaerobic methanotrophic archaea found to have genes for the full reverse methanogenesis pathway. The full pathway of acetyl-CoA has also been found in M. nitroreducens.

Ecology 
This species was first described by Haroon et al. in 2013 after adding methane, ammonium, and nitrate to a bioreactor where a single organism proliferated. Methanoperedens nitroreducens survives in oxygen-free environments and can typically be found in deeper down in freshwater ecosystems. M. nitroreducens is more likely to exist and be competitive in an environment enriched in nitrate as opposed to sulfate or other potential terminal electron acceptors. M. nitroreducens competes against other organisms who reduce nitrate with other carbon sources. 

Requiring both methane and nitrate, this organism is commonly found in the area between oxic and anoxic zones. While originally known as an anaerobic species, it has oxygen tolerance mechanisms. When it is in contact with oxygen, M. nitroreducens will up-regulate genes needed to protect against oxidative stress. This differs from other anaerobic species who suffer irreversible damage when exposed to oxygen, hinting at future applications for this archaeal species.

References 

Archaea
Methane
Nitrates